State Trunk Highway 188 (often called Highway 188, STH-188 or WIS 188) is a  state highway in Dane and Columbia counties in south–central Wisconsin, United States, that runs north–south from near Sauk City to near Merrimac.

Route description
WIS 188 starts in rural Dane County across the Wisconsin River from Sauk City. The highway runs northward through farm fields on the east side of the river, crosses into Columbia County, and heads to an intersection with WIS 60 east of Prairie du Sac. The two highways run concurrently to the northeast for about  before WIS 188 separates and turns northward again. Near Lake Wisconsin, the highway turns east and then back north before sticking to an eastward course along a bend in the river. At the intersection with WIS 113 near the Merrimac Ferry, WIS 188 terminates.

History
Around 1942, the routing of WIS 78 was shifted to the east side of the Wisconsin River between Sauk City and the Merrimac Ferry. later, in 1947, that highway was moved back to its previous routing, and the highway on the east side of the river was rechristened WIS 188. The route of WIS 188 has remained unchanged since.

Major intersections

See also

References

External links

188
Transportation in Dane County, Wisconsin
Transportation in Columbia County, Wisconsin